Bike paths around Melbourne have been developed over many decades. Many off-road trails follow current or former watercourses, such as the Darebin Creek Trail and the Koonung Creek Trail and traverse long distances, meaning that responsibility for planning and maintenance is split between various State Government authorities and local councils. With the increased recognition from all levels of government of the benefit of cycling activities, Melbourne today has a network of shared bicycle trails which have developed over time along its river and creek systems and alongside freeways and railways.

The length of the trails in Melbourne, as of 2014, totals around 1,900 km. It is possible to cycle from Werribee in the west to Research in the east (approx 62 km) and Craigieburn in the north and Seaford in the south (about 78 km) and points in between and only have to travel on the occasional piece of road. Melbourne's bike paths are often accessed from its train system. Ongoing community campaigns, such as those of Bicycle Network, have resulted in some expansion and improvement of the network.

Usage 
In 2006 VicRoads installed bicycle counters on the trails, at seventeen locations throughout inner Melbourne. These counters are providing data on the usage of Melbourne's trails. For example: the Anniversary Outer Circle Trail at Cotham Rd Kew, has about 20 cyclists per hour throughout the day, whereas the Yarra River Trail, north side of Morell Bridge, has a distinct peak hour rate of about 250/hr and 50/hr in non-peak periods. This supports the observation that the former is used mainly for recreation and the latter for recreation and commuting.

Bike paths along freeways 

A number of freeways have been constructed with separate bicycle paths built alongside, including Eastlink, the Deer Park Bypass, and the Metropolitan Ring Road. However, the CityLink tollway system was built without including provision for cyclists along several sections including the Bolte Bridge. Cyclists are also excluded from riding the West Gate Freeway over the West Gate Bridge, although exceptions are made for some special bicycle events like Around the Bay in a Day organized by Bicycle Network. The Westgate Punt ferry service provides an alternative to the bridge.

Future expansion 
In December 2008, the Victorian State Government released their Victorian Transport Plan which budgeted $100 million for cycling over 12 years. In 2009, the Victorian Cycling Strategy was also released. However the Victorian Auditor-General reviewed this Strategy in 2012 and found there had been almost no progress on the items in the Plan, which included more cycle lanes and junction treatments, and that it had been sidelined by the new Liberal government. In 2012 there was an outcry from cyclists following the almost total deletion of cycling projects from the State budget, with protests organized by Bicycle Network Victoria.

Parks Victoria strategy includes expanding the trails 

Development of the network is slowed by the number of agencies that may be involved when a new path is proposed. Such agencies could include VicRoads, VicTrack, Parks Victoria, Melbourne Water and the local Councils. The network is fragmented along Council boundaries. Some examples would include: 
the St Georges Rd Trail at the boundary of Darebin and Whittlesea
the Gardiners Creek gap at the boundary of Boroondara, Stonnington and Monash
the termination of the East Malvern Station to Centre Rd Trail at the boundary of Monash and Kingston

See also 
 Cycling in Melbourne
 Cycling in Victoria
 :Category:Bike paths in Melbourne
 :Category:Rail trails in Australia

References

External links 
 Bike Paths & Rail Trails Guide
 The Principal Bicycle Network (PBN)
 Melbourne bike routes @ bikely.com
 Where to Ride Melbourne cycling guide book
 Melbourne Bike Trails

 
Cycling in Melbourne